Herman Arthur Schuessler (July 20, 1914 – July 5, 1997) was an American professional basketball player. He played for the Indianapolis Kautskys in the National Basketball League during the 1938–39 season and averaged 3.7 points per game.

References

1914 births
1997 deaths
American men's basketball players
Basketball players from Indiana
Centers (basketball)
Indianapolis Kautskys players
Sportspeople from Lafayette, Indiana